National Safety Council  is a premier, non-profit, self-financing and tripartite apex body at the national level in India. It is an autonomous body, which was set up by the Government of India, Ministry of Labour and Employment on 4 March 1966 to generate, develop and sustain a voluntary movement on Safety, Health and Environment (SHE) at the national level. It was registered as a Society under the Societies Registration Act, 1860 and subsequently, as a Public Trust under the Bombay Public Trust Act, 1950.

Vision
Serving the Society by creating a preventive culture, scientific mindset and organised approach to SHE issues.  It is our belief that these issues are a basic humanitarian concern.  We equally believe that their effective addressal is greatly facilitated if their intrinsic relationship with quality and productivity is well demonstrated.

Activities
 Conducting specialised training Courses, Conferences, Seminars & Workshops all over the Nation
 Conducting consultancy studies such as Safety Audits, Hazard Evaluation, Emergency Management Planning & Risk Assessment
 Designing and developing HSE promotional materials & publications
 Facilitating organisations in celebrating various campaigns e.g. Road safety week, Safety Day, Fire Service Week, World Environment Day
 Organised many national and international conferences e.g. XIII World Congress (1993) and XI APOSHO Conference (1995) and implemented many a prestigious project

A computerised Management Information Service has been established for collection, retrieval and dissemination of information to achieve its Objective
.
A DVD of Fire Risk Assessment was prepared for education purpose by National Safety Council.

Our Website Was Developed by Digidopt

References

Labour in India
Government agencies established in 1966
Organisations based in Mumbai
Government agencies of India
Safety organizations
1966 establishments in Maharashtra